Adelaide Cottage (formerly known as Adelaide Lodge) is a house in Windsor Home Park just east of Windsor Castle, in Berkshire. It is the principal residence of the Prince and Princess of Wales.

Design 
The cottage incorporates building materials of John Nash's Royal Lodge from Windsor Great Park. At the time of construction in 1831, it was described as "chastely elegant" and having two public rooms, in addition to a retiring room for the queen, and a pages' room, as well as furnishings from the former royal lodge and a marble fireplace mantel in the regency Graeco-Egyptian style. 

The present cottage has four bedrooms. The ceiling of its principal bedroom reuses decorative elements, including gilt dolphins and ropes, from the former royal yacht, HMY Royal George. It has been listed Grade II* on the National Heritage List for England since October 1975. Adelaide Cottage is located in Windsor Home Park.

History 
In 1831, under the supervision of architect Jeffry Wyatville, the house was erected in the picturesque style for the wife of William IV, Adelaide of Saxe-Meiningen. Queen Victoria often visited the residence for breakfast and tea.

Group Captain Peter Townsend, equerry to George VI, was given the property as a grace-and-favour residence in 1944. Townsend referred to the cottage as an "icebox" with only two radiators. Simon Rhodes, the son of Elizabeth II's cousin Margaret Rhodes, previously resided at the cottage. Major renovations took place in 2015, with the historical architecture still intact. In the summer of 2022, Adelaide Cottage became the home of William, Prince of Wales and Catherine, Princess of Wales, and their three children, Prince George, Princess Charlotte and Prince Louis. The family pays market rent.

See also
Kensington Palace, the official London residence of the Prince and Princess of Wales
Anmer Hall, part of the Sandringham estate in Norfolk, the country residence of the Prince and Princess of Wales
Llwynywermod, a house in Carmarthenshire, Wales, the Prince and Princess of Wales residence in Wales, owned by the Duchy of Cornwall

References

Buildings and structures in Windsor, Berkshire
Grade II* listed buildings in Berkshire
Grade II* listed houses
Houses completed in 1831
Jeffry Wyatville buildings
Windsor Castle
1831 establishments in England